

Events

Pre-1600
AD 69 – In the Second Battle of Bedriacum, troops loyal to Vespasian defeat those of Emperor Vitellius.
1260 – Chartres Cathedral is dedicated in the presence of King Louis IX of France.
1360 – The Treaty of Brétigny is ratified, marking the end of the first phase of the Hundred Years' War.
1590 – John White, the governor of the second Roanoke Colony, returns to England after an unsuccessful search for the "lost" colonists.
1596 – The second Spanish armada sets sail to strike against England, but is smashed by storms off Cape Finisterre forcing a retreat to port.

1601–1900
1641 – Felim O'Neill of Kinard, the leader of the Irish Rebellion, issues his Proclamation of Dungannon, justifying the uprising and declaring continued loyalty to King Charles I of England.
1648 – The Peace of Westphalia is signed, marking the end of the Thirty Years' War and the Eighty Years' War.
1795 – Poland is completely consumed by Russia, Prussia and Austria.
1812 – Napoleonic Wars: The Battle of Maloyaroslavets takes place near Moscow.
1851 – William Lassell discovers the moons Umbriel and Ariel orbiting Uranus.
1857 – Sheffield F.C., the world's oldest association football club still in operation, is founded in England.
1861 – The first transcontinental telegraph line across the United States is completed.
1871 – An estimated 17 to 22 Chinese immigrants are lynched in Los Angeles, California.
1889 – Henry Parkes delivers the Tenterfield Oration, effectively starting the federation process in Australia.
1900 – U.S. Government announces plans to buy Danish West Indies for $7 million.

1901–present
1901 – Annie Edson Taylor becomes the first person to go over Niagara Falls in a barrel.
1902 – Guatemala's Santa María Volcano begins to erupt, becoming the third-largest eruption of the 20th century.
1911 – Orville Wright remains in the air nine minutes and 45 seconds in a glider at Kill Devil Hills, North Carolina.
1912 – First Balkan War: The Battle of Kirk Kilisse concludes with a Bulgarian victory against the Ottoman Empire.
  1912   – First Balkan War: The Battle of Kumanovo concludes with the Serbian victory against the Ottoman Empire.
1917 – World War I: Italy suffers a disastrous defeat at the Battle of Caporetto on the Austro-Italian front.
1918 – World War I: Italian victory in the Battle of Vittorio Veneto.
1926 – Harry Houdini's last performance takes place at the Garrick Theatre in Detroit.
1929 – "Black Thursday" on the New York Stock Exchange.
1930 – A bloodless coup d'état in Brazil ends the First Republic, replacing it with the Vargas Era.
1931 – The George Washington Bridge opens to public traffic over the Hudson River.
1944 – World War II: Japan's center force is temporarily repulsed in the Battle of Leyte Gulf.
1945 – The United Nations Charter comes into effect.
1946 – A camera on board the V-2 No. 13 rocket takes the first photograph of earth from outer space.
1947 – Famed animator Walt Disney testifies before the House Un-American Activities Committee, naming Disney employees he believes to be communists.
1949 – The cornerstone of the United Nations Headquarters is laid.
1954 – US President Dwight D. Eisenhower pledges United States support to South Vietnam.
1957 – The United States Air Force starts the X-20 Dyna-Soar manned space program.
1960 – Nedelin catastrophe: An R-16 ballistic missile explodes on the launch pad at the Soviet Union's Baikonur Cosmodrome space facility, killing over 100 people, including Field Marshal Mitrofan Nedelin.
1963 – An oxygen leak from an R-9 Desna missile at the Baikonur Cosmodrome triggers a fire that kills seven people.
1964 – Northern Rhodesia gains independence from the United Kingdom and becomes Zambia.
1975 – In Iceland, 90% of women take part in a national strike, refusing to work in protest of gender inequality.
1980 – The government of Poland legalizes the Solidarity trade union. 
1986 – Nezar Hindawi is sentenced to 45 years in prison, the longest sentence handed down by a British court, for the attempted bombing of an El Al flight at Heathrow Airport.
1990 – Italian prime minister Giulio Andreotti reveals to the Italian parliament the existence of Gladio, the Italian NATO force formed in 1956, intended to be activated in the event of a Warsaw Pact invasion.
1992 – The Toronto Blue Jays become the first Major League Baseball team based outside the United States to win the World Series.
1998 – Deep Space 1 is launched to explore the asteroid belt and test new spacecraft technologies.
2003 – Concorde makes its last commercial flight.
2004 – Arsenal Football Club loses to Manchester United, ending a row of unbeaten matches at 49 matches, which is the record in the Premier League.
2005 – Hurricane Wilma makes landfall in Florida, resulting in 35 direct and 26 indirect fatalities and causing $20.6B USD in damage.
2007 – Chang'e 1, the first satellite in the Chinese Lunar Exploration Program, is launched from Xichang Satellite Launch Center.
2008 – "Bloody Friday" saw many of the world's stock exchanges experience the worst declines in their history, with drops of around 10% in most indices.
2014 – The China National Space Administration launches an experimental lunar mission, Chang'e 5-T1, which will loop behind the Moon and return to Earth.
2015 – A driver crashes into the Oklahoma State Homecoming parade, killing four people and injuring 34.
2016 – A French surveillance aircraft flying to Libya crashes on takeoff in Malta, killing all five people on board.

Births

Pre-1600
AD 51 – Domitian, Roman emperor (d. 96)
1378 – David Stewart, Duke of Rothesay heir to the throne of Scotland (d. 1402)
1503 – Isabella of Portugal (d. 1539)
1561 – Anthony Babington, English conspirator (Babington Plot) (d. 1586)

1601–1900
1632 – Antonie van Leeuwenhoek, Dutch biologist and microbiologist (d. 1723)
1637 – Lorenzo Magalotti, Italian philosopher (d. 1712)
1650 – Steven Blankaart, Dutch entomologist (d. 1704)
1675 – Richard Temple, 1st Viscount Cobham, English field marshal and politician, Lord Lieutenant of Buckinghamshire (d. 1749)
1713 – Marie Fel, French soprano and actress (d. 1794)
1763 – Dorothea von Schlegel, German author and translator (d. 1839)
1784 – Moses Montefiore, British philanthropist, sheriff and banker (d. 1885)
1788 – Sarah Josepha Hale, American author and poet (d. 1879) 
1798 – Massimo d'Azeglio, Piedmontese-Italian statesman, novelist and painter (d. 1866)
1804 – Wilhelm Eduard Weber, German physicist and academic (d. 1891)
1811 – Ferdinand Hiller, German composer and conductor (d. 1885)
  1811   – Georg August Wallin, Finnish explorer, orientalist, and professor (d. 1852)
1830 – Marianne North, English biologist and painter (d. 1890)
1838 – Annie Edson Taylor, American stuntwoman and educator (d. 1921)
1854 – Hendrik Willem Bakhuis Roozeboom, Dutch chemist and academic (d. 1907)
1855 – James S. Sherman, American lawyer and politician, 27th Vice President of the United States (d. 1912)
1857 – Ned Williamson, American baseball player (d. 1894)
1868 – Alexandra David-Néel, Belgian-French explorer and author (d. 1969)
1872 – Peter O'Connor, Irish long jumper (d. 1957)
1873 – E. T. Whittaker, British mathematician and physicist (d. 1956)
1875 – Konstantin Yuon, Russian painter and set designer (d. 1958)
1876 – Saya San, Burmese monk and activist (d. 1931)
1879 – B. A. Rolfe, American bandleader and producer (d. 1956)
1882 – Sybil Thorndike, English actress (d. 1976)
1884 – Emil Fjellström, Swedish actor (d. 1944)
1885 – Alice Perry, Irish engineer and poet (d. 1969)
1887 – Victoria Eugenie of Battenberg (d. 1969)
  1887   – Octave Lapize, French cyclist and pilot (d. 1917)
1891 – Rafael Trujillo, Dominican soldier and politician, 36th President of the Dominican Republic (d. 1961)
  1891   – Brenda Ueland, American journalist, author, and educator (d. 1985)
1894 – Bibhutibhushan Mukhopadhyay, Indian author, poet, and playwright (d. 1987)
1895 – Jack Warner, English actor and singer (d. 1981)
1896 – Marjorie Joyner, American make-up artist and businesswoman (d. 1994)
1898 – Peng Dehuai, Chinese general, 1st Minister of National Defense of the People's Republic of China (d. 1974)
1899 – Teikō Shiotani, Japanese photographer (d. 1988)

1901–present
1901 – Gilda Gray, Polish-American actress, singer, and dancer (d. 1959)
1903 – Melvin Purvis, American FBI agent (d. 1960)
1904 – Moss Hart, American director and playwright (d. 1961)
  1904   – A.K. Golam Jilani, Bangladeshi activist (d. 1932)
1905 – Fran Zwitter, Slovenian historian and academic (d. 1988)
1906 – Alexander Gelfond, Russian mathematician and cryptographer (d. 1968)
1907 – Patricia Griffin, Montserratian nurse and social worker (d. 1986)
1908 – John Tuzo Wilson, Canadian geologist and geophysicist (d. 1993)
1909 – Bill Carr, American runner (d. 1966)
1910 – Stella Brooks, American singer (d. 2002)
  1910   – Joe L. Evins, American lawyer and politician (d. 1984)
  1910   – Gunter d'Alquen, German SS officer and journalist (d. 1998)
  1910   – James K. Woolnough, American general (d. 1996)
  1910   – Yoel Zussman, Polish-Israeli lawyer and judge (d. 1982)
1911 – Paul Grégoire, Canadian cardinal (d. 1993)
  1911   – Sonny Terry, American singer and harmonica player (d. 1986)
1912 – Peter Gellhorn, German conductor (music) (d. 2004)
  1912   – Murray Golden, American television director (d. 1991)
  1912   – Silviu Bindea, Romanian footballer (d. 1992)
1913 – Tito Gobbi, Italian actor and singer (d. 1984)
1914 – Charles Craig Cannon, American colonel (d. 1992)
  1914   – František Čapek, Czechoslovakian canoeist (d. 2008)
  1914   – Lakshmi Sahgal, Indian Independence movement revolutionary and Officer of Indian National Army (d. 2012)
1915 – Bob Kane, American author and illustrator (d. 1998)
  1915   – Marghanita Laski, English journalist and author (d. 1988)
1916 – Anne Sharp, Scottish soprano and actress (d. 2011)
1917 – Marie Foster, American activist (d. 2003)
1918 – Doreen Tovey, English author (d. 2008)
1919 – Frank Piasecki, American engineer and pilot (d. 2008)
1920 – Marcel-Paul Schützenberger, French mathematician and academic (d. 1996)
  1920   – Steve Conway, British singer (d. 1952)
1921 – Ted Ditchburn, English footballer and manager (d. 2005)
  1921   – R. K. Laxman, Indian illustrator (d. 2015)
1922 – George Miller, American educator and politician, Mayor of Tucson (d. 2014)
1923 – Robin Day, English lieutenant and journalist (d. 2000)
  1923   – Denise Levertov, British-born American poet  (d. 1997)
1924 – John Brereton Barlow, South African cardiologist and physician (d. 2008)
  1924   – Mary Lee, American actress and singer (d. 1996)
  1924   – Fuat Sezgin, Turkish historian and academic (d. 2018)
1925 – Luciano Berio, Italian composer and educator (d. 2003)
  1925   – Al Feldstein, American author and illustrator (d. 2014)
  1925   – Willie Mabon, American-French singer-songwriter and pianist (d. 1985)
  1925   – Ken Mackay, Australian cricketer (d. 1982)
  1925   – Ieng Sary, Vietnamese-Cambodian politician co-founded the Khmer Rouge (d. 2013)
  1925   – Paul Vaughan, English journalist and radio host (d. 2014)
1926 – Rafael Azcona, Spanish author and screenwriter (d. 2008)
  1926   – Y. A. Tittle, American football player (d. 2017)
1927 – Gilbert Bécaud, French singer-songwriter, pianist, and actor (d. 2001)
  1927   – Jean-Claude Pascal, French actor and singer (d. 1992)
  1927   – Barbara Robinson, American author and poet (d. 2013)
1928 – George Bullard, American baseball player (d. 2002)
1929 – Hubert Aquin, Canadian activist, author, and director (d. 1977)
  1929   – George Crumb, American composer and educator (d. 2022)
  1929   – Rachel Douglas-Home, 27th Baroness Dacre, English wife of William Douglas-Home (d. 2012)
  1929   – Yordan Radichkov, Bulgarian author and playwright (d. 2004)
  1929   – Sos Sargsyan, Armenian actor (d. 2013)
1930 – Jack Angel, American voice actor (d. 2021)
  1930   – The Big Bopper, American singer-songwriter and guitarist (d. 1959)
  1930   – Elaine Feinstein, English poet, author, and playwright (d. 2019)
  1930   – Johan Galtung, Norwegian sociologist and mathematician
  1930   – James Scott Douglas, English-born Scottish racing driver and 6th Baronet Douglas (d. 1969)
  1930   – Ahmad Shah of Pahang (d. 2019)
1931 – Sofia Gubaidulina, Russian-German pianist and composer
  1931   – Ken Utsui, Japanese actor (d. 2014)
1932 – Stephen Covey, American author and educator (d. 2012)
  1932   – Pierre-Gilles de Gennes, French physicist and academic, Nobel Prize laureate (d. 2007)
  1932   – Adrian Mitchell, English journalist, author, poet, and playwright (d. 2008)
  1932   – Robert Mundell, Canadian economist and academic, Nobel Prize laureate (d. 2021)
1933 – Reginald Kray, English gangster (d. 2000)
  1933   – Ronald Kray, English gangster (d. 1995)
  1933   – Norman Rush, American author and educator
1934 – John G. Cramer, American physicist and author
  1934   – Glen Glenn, American singer-songwriter and guitarist
  1934   – Margie Masters, Australian golfer (d. 2022)
  1934   – Sammy Petrillo, American actor (d. 2009)
  1934   – Sanger D. Shafer, American singer-songwriter (d. 2019)
1935 – Malcolm Bilson, American pianist, musicologist, and educator
  1935   – Antonino Calderone, Italian mobster (d. 2013)
  1935   – Mark Tully, Indian-English journalist and author
1936 – Jüri Arrak, Estonian painter (d. 2022)
  1936   – Jimmy Dawkins, American singer and guitarist (d. 2013)
  1936   – David Nelson, American actor, director, and producer (d. 2011)
  1936   – Bill Wyman, English singer-songwriter, bass player, and producer
1937 – Miguel Ángel Coria, Spanish composer and educator (d. 2016)
  1937   – Santo Farina, American guitarist and songwriter
  1937   – John Goetz, American baseball player (d. 2008)
  1937   – Heribert Offermanns, German chemist and academic
  1937   – M. Rosaria Piomelli, Italian-American architect and academic
  1937   – Petar Stipetić, Croatian general (d. 2018)
1938 – Stephen Resnick, American economist and academic (d. 2013)
1939 – F. Murray Abraham, American actor
1940 – Martin Campbell, New Zealand director and producer
  1940   – Rafał Piszcz, Polish canoe racer (d. 2012)
  1940   – David Sainsbury, Baron Sainsbury of Turville, English businessman and academic
  1940   – Yossi Sarid, Israeli politician (d. 2015)
1941 – William H. Dobelle, American medical researcher (d. 2004)
  1941   – Peter Takeo Okada, Japanese archbishop
  1941   – Merle Woo, Asian American activist
1942 – Stephen R. Bloom, English physician and academic
  1942   – Maggie Blye, American actress (d. 2016)
  1942   – Frank Delaney, Irish journalist and author (d. 2017)
  1942   – Rafael Cordero Santiago, Puerto Rican politician, 132nd Mayor of Ponce (d. 2004)
  1942   – Fernando Vallejo, Colombian biologist and author
1943 – Bill Dundee, Scottish-American wrestler and manager
  1943   – Phil Hawthorne, Australian rugby player and coach (d. 1994)
1944 – Viktor Prokopenko, Ukrainian footballer and manager (d. 2007)
  1944   – Bettye Swann,  American singer-songwriter
1945 – Gérald Larose, Canadian educator and union leader
1946 – Jerry Edmonton, Canadian drummer (d. 1993)
1947 – Kevin Kline, American actor and singer
1948 – Phil Bennett, Welsh rugby player (d. 2022)
  1948   – Kweisi Mfume, American lawyer and politician
1949 – John Markoff, American journalist and author
  1949   – Keith Rowley, Trinidadian volcanologist and politician, 7th Prime Minister of Trinidad and Tobago
1950 – Iggy Arroyo, Filipino lawyer and politician (d. 2012)
  1950   – Pablove Black, Jamaican singer-songwriter, keyboard player, and producer
  1950   – Miguel Ángel Pichetto, Argentinian lawyer and politician
  1950   – Miroslav Sládek, Czech politician
  1950   – Gabriella Sica, Italian poet and author
  1950   – Maria Teschler-Nicola, Austrian biologist, anthropologist, and ethnologist
1951 – George Tsontakis, American composer and conductor
1952 – Keith Bain, Canadian educator and politician
  1952   – Francesco Camaldo, Italian priest
  1952   – Ángel Torres, Dominican baseball player
1953 – Christoph Daum, German footballer and manager
1954 – Doug Davidson, American actor
  1954   – Tom Mulcair, Canadian lawyer and politician
  1954   – Jožo Ráž, Slovak singer-songwriter and bass player 
  1954   – Mike Rounds, American businessman and politician, junior senator from South Dakota
  1954   – Brad Sherman, American accountant, lawyer, and politician
  1954   – Malcolm Turnbull, Australian journalist and politician, 29th Prime Minister of Australia
1955 – Cheryl Studer, American soprano and actress
1956 – Jeff Merkley, American businessman and politician
1957 – Ron Gardenhire, German-American baseball player and manager
  1957   – John Kassir, American actor and voice actor 
1959 – Dominique Baert, French lawyer and politician
  1959   – Gunnar Bakke, Norwegian banker and politician, 65th Mayor of Bergen
  1959   – Chihiro Fujioka, Japanese director and composer
  1959   – Michelle Lujan Grisham, American lawyer and politician
  1959   – Rowland S. Howard, Australian guitarist and songwriter (d. 2009)
  1959   – Denis Troch, French footballer and manager
  1959   – Annette Vilhelmsen, Danish educator and politician, Danish Minister of Social Affairs
1960 – Ian Baker-Finch, Australian golfer and sportscaster
  1960   – Jaime Garzón, Colombian journalist, lawyer, and activist (d. 1999)
  1960   – Joachim Winkelhock, German racing driver
  1960   – BD Wong, American actor 
1961 – Mary Bono, American gymnast and politician
  1961   – Bruce Castor, American lawyer and politician
1962 – Yves Bertucci, French footballer and manager
  1962   – Ian Dalziel, English footballer and manager
  1962   – Jonathan Davies, Welsh rugby player and television host
  1962   – Debbie Googe, English bass player and songwriter 
  1962   – Andrea Horwath, Canadian politician
  1962   – Gibby Mbasela, Zambian footballer (d. 2000)
1963 – Mark Grant, American baseball player and sportscaster
  1963   – John Hendrie, Scottish footballer and manager
1964 – Rosana Arbelo, Spanish singer-songwriter and guitarist
  1964   – Paul Bonwick, Canadian businessman and politician
  1964   – Dmitri Gorkov, Russian footballer and manager
  1964   – Janele Hyer-Spencer, American lawyer and politician
  1964   – Ray LeBlanc, American ice hockey player
  1964   – Doug Lee, American basketball player
1965 – Kyriakos Velopoulos, German-Greek journalist and politician
1966 – Roman Abramovich, Russian businessman and politician
  1966   – Simon Danczuk, English academic and politician
1967 – Ian Bishop, Trinidadian cricketer and sportscaster
  1967   – Olo Brown, Samoan-New Zealand rugby player
  1967   – Jacqueline McKenzie, Australian actress
  1967   – Esther McVey, English television host and politician
1968 – Francisco Clavet, Spanish tennis player
  1968   – Mark Walton, American voice actor and illustrator
  1968   – Robert Wilonsky, American journalist and critic
1969 – Emma Donoghue, Irish-Canadian author
1970 – Rob Leslie-Carter, English field hockey player and engineer
  1970   – Jeff Mangum, American singer-songwriter and guitarist
1971 – Aaron Bailey, American football player
  1971   – Gustavo Jorge, Argentina international rugby union player
  1971   – Zephyr Teachout, American academic
  1971   – Diane Guthrie-Gresham, Jamaican track and field athlete
  1971   – Caprice Bourret, American model and actress
1972 – Pat Williams, American football player and coach
  1972   – Jeremy Wright, English lawyer and politician, Attorney General for England and Wales
1973 – Meelis Friedenthal, Estonian author and academic
  1973   – Kurt Kuenne, American filmmaker, known for the documentary Dear Zachary
  1973   – Levi Leipheimer, American cyclist
  1973   – Jackie McNamara, Scottish footballer and manager
  1973   – Laura Veirs, American singer-songwriter and guitarist
  1973   – Jeff Wilson, New Zealand rugby player, cricketer, and radio host
1974 – Gábor Babos, Hungarian footballer
  1974   – Corey Dillon, American football player
  1974   – Wilton Guerrero, Dominican baseball player and scout
  1974   – Jamal Mayers, Canadian ice hockey player and sportscaster
1975 – Juan Pablo Ángel, Colombian footballer
  1975   – Frank Seator, Liberian footballer (d. 2013)
1976 – Matteo Mazzantini, Italian rugby player
  1976   – Petar Stoychev, Bulgarian swimmer
1977 – Iván Kaviedes, Ecuadoran footballer
1978 – Carlos Edwards, Trinidadian footballer
  1978   – James Hopes, Australian cricketer
1979 – Ben Gillies, Australian drummer and songwriter 
  1979   – Marijonas Petravičius, Lithuanian basketball player
1980 – Monica, American singer-songwriter, producer, and actress
  1980   – Matthew Amoah, Ghanaian footballer
  1980   – Kerrin McEvoy, Australian jockey
  1980   – Zac Posen, American fashion designer
  1980   – Christian Vander, German footballer
  1980   – Casey Wilson, American actress and screenwriter
1981 – Kemal Aslan, Turkish footballer
  1981   – Sebastián Bueno, Argentinian footballer
  1981   – Fredrik Mikkelsen, Norwegian guitarist and composer
  1981   – Tila Tequila, Singaporean-American model, actress, and singer
  1981   – Alfred Vargas, Filipino actor and politician
1982 – Fairuz Fauzy, Malaysian racing driver
  1982   – Macay McBride, American baseball player
1983 – Adrienne Bailon, American singer-songwriter, dancer, and actress 
  1983   – Chris Colabello, American baseball player
  1983   – Hernán Garin, Argentinian footballer
  1983   – Michael Gordon, Australian rugby league player
  1983   – Brian Vickers, American race car driver
1984 – Lougee Basabas, Filipino singer-songwriter 
  1984   – Jonas Gustavsson, Swedish ice hockey player
  1984   – Kaela Kimura, Japanese singer-songwriter 
1985 – Robert Cornthwaite, English-Australian footballer
  1985   – Matthew Robinson, Australian snowboarder (d. 2014)
  1985   – Wayne Rooney, English footballer
  1985   – Oscar Wendt, Swedish footballer
1986 – Drake, Canadian rapper and actor
  1986   – John Ruddy, English footballer
1987 – Anthony Vanden Borre, Belgian footballer
  1987   – Charlie White, American figure skater
1988 – Mitch Inman, Australian rugby player
  1988   – Christopher Linke, German race walker
  1988   – Demont Mitchell, Bahamian footballer
1989 – Anderson Conceição, Brazilian footballer
  1989   – Eric Hosmer, American baseball player
  1989   – PewDiePie, Swedish YouTuber
1990 – Peyton Siva, American basketball player
  1990   – Mohammed Jahfali, Saudi Arabia international footballer
  1990   – Jake Knott, American football linebacker
  1990   – Elijah Greer, American middle-distance runner
  1990   – Danilo Petrucci, Italian motorcycle racer
  1990   – İlkay Gündoğan, German footballer
1991 – Torstein Andersen Aase, Norwegian footballer
  1991   – Bojan Dubljević, Montenegrin basketball player
1992 – Marrion Gopez, Filipino actor, singer, and dancer
  1992   – Ding Liren, Chinese chess grandmaster
1994 – Krystal Jung, American-South Korean singer, dancer, and actress
  1994   – Tereza Martincová, Czech tennis player
  1994   – Jalen Ramsey, American football player
1995 – Vincent Leuluai, Australian rugby league player
1996 – Océane Dodin, French tennis player
  1996   – Kyla Ross, American gymnast
1997 – Claudia Fragapane, English gymnast
1998 – Daya, American singer

Deaths

Pre-1600
 935 – Li Yu, Chinese official and chancellor 
 996 – Hugh Capet, French king
1152 – Jocelin of Soissons, French theologian, philosopher and composer
1168 – William IV, French nobleman
1260 – Qutuz, Egyptian sultan
1375 – Valdemar IV, Danish king (b. 1320)
1537 – Jane Seymour, English queen and wife of Henry VIII of England (b. c.1508)
1572 – Edward Stanley, 3rd Earl of Derby, English admiral and politician, Lord Lieutenant of Lancashire (b. 1508)

1601–1900
1601 – Tycho Brahe, Danish astronomer and alchemist (b. 1546)
1633 – Jean Titelouze, French organist and composer (b. 1562/3)
1642 – Robert Bertie, 1st Earl of Lindsey, English peer and courtier (b. 1582)
1655 – Pierre Gassendi, French priest, astronomer, and mathematician (b. 1592)
1669 – William Prynne, English lawyer and author (b. 1600)
1672 – John Webb, English architect and scholar (b. 1611)
1725 – Alessandro Scarlatti, Italian composer and educator (b. 1660)
1799 – Carl Ditters von Dittersdorf, Austrian violinist and composer (b. 1739)
1821 – Elias Boudinot, American lawyer and politician, 10th President of the Continental Congress (b. 1740)
1824 – Israel Bissell, American patriot post rider during American Revolutionary War (b. 1752)
1852 – Daniel Webster, American lawyer and politician, 14th United States Secretary of State (b. 1782)
1875 – Raffaello Carboni, Italian-Australian author and poet (b. 1817)
1898 – Pierre Puvis de Chavannes, French painter and illustrator (b. 1824)

1901–present
1915 – Désiré Charnay, French archaeologist and photographer (b. 1828)
1917 – James Carroll Beckwith, American painter and academic (b. 1852)
1922 – George Cadbury, English businessman (b. 1839)
1935 – Dutch Schultz, American mob boss (b. 1902)
1937 – Nils Wahlbom, Swedish actor (b. 1886) 
1938 – Ernst Barlach, German sculptor and playwright (b. 1870)
1943 – Hector de Saint-Denys Garneau, Canadian poet and painter (b. 1912)
1944 – Louis Renault, French engineer and businessman, co-founded the Renault Company (b. 1877)
1945 – Vidkun Quisling, Norwegian soldier and politician, Minister President of Norway (b. 1887)
1948 – Franz Lehár, Austrian-Hungarian composer (b. 1870)
  1948   – Frederic L. Paxson, American historian and author (b. 1877)
1949 – Yaroslav Halan, Ukrainian playwright and publicist (b. 1902)
1958 – G. E. Moore, English philosopher and academic (b. 1873)
1960 – Yevgeny Ostashev, the test pilot of rocket, participant in the launch of the first artificial Earth satellite, Lenin prize winner, Candidate of Technical Sciences (b. 1924)
1964 – Toni Kinshofer, German mountaineer (b. 1931)
1965 – Hans Meerwein, German chemist (b. 1879)
1966 – Sofya Yanovskaya, Russian mathematician and historian (b. 1896)
1969 – Behçet Kemal Çağlar, Turkish poet and politician (b. 1908)
1970 – Richard Hofstadter, American historian and author (b. 1916)
1971 – Carl Ruggles, American composer (b. 1876)
  1971   – Jo Siffert, Swiss race car driver and motorcycle racer (b. 1936)
  1971   – Chuck Hughes, NFL player died during a game (b. 1943)
1972 – Jackie Robinson, American baseball player and sportscaster (b. 1919)
  1972   – Claire Windsor, American actress (b. 1892)
1974 – David Oistrakh, Ukrainian violinist (b. 1908)
1975 – İsmail Erez, Turkish lawyer and diplomat, Turkish Ambassador to France (b. 1919)
  1975   – Zdzisław Żygulski, Polish historian, author, and academic (b. 1888)
1979 – Carlo Abarth, Italian automobile designer and founded of Abarth (b. 1908)
1983 – Jiang Wen-Ye, Taiwanese composer and educator (b. 1910)
1985 – Richie Evans, American race car driver (b. 1941)
  1985   – Maurice Roy, Canadian cardinal (b. 1905)
1989 – Jerzy Kukuczka, Polish mountaineer (b. 1948)
1991 – Gene Roddenberry, American captain, screenwriter, and producer, created Star Trek (b. 1921)
  1991   – Ismat Chughtai, Indian author and screenwriter (b. 1915)
1992 – Laurie Colwin,  American novelist and short story writer  (b. 1944)
1993 – Heinz Kubsch, German footballer (b. 1930)
1994 – Yannis Hotzeas, Greek theoretician and author (b. 1930)
  1994   – Raul Julia, Puerto Rican-American actor and singer (b. 1940)
1997 – Don Messick, American voice actor and singer (b. 1926)
1999 – Berthe Qvistgaard, Danish actress (b. 1910) 
2001 – Kathleen Ankers, American actress and set designer (b. 1919)
  2001   – Wolf Rüdiger Hess, German author and critic (b. 1937)
  2001   – Jaromil Jireš, Czech director and screenwriter (b. 1935)
2002 – Winton M. Blount, American soldier and politician, 59th United States Postmaster General (b. 1921)
  2002   – Hernán Gaviria, Colombian footballer (b. 1969)
  2002   – Harry Hay, English-American activist, co-founded the Mattachine Society and Radical Faeries (b. 1912)
  2002   – Peggy Moran, American actress and singer (b. 1918)
2004 – Randy Dorton, American engineer (b. 1954)
  2004   – Ricky Hendrick, American race car driver and businessman (b. 1980)
  2004   – James Aloysius Hickey, American cardinal (b. 1920)
  2004   – Maaja Ranniku, Estonian chess player (b. 1941)
2005 – Joy Clements, American soprano and actress (b. 1932)
  2005   – José Azcona del Hoyo, Honduran businessman and politician, President of Honduras (b. 1926)
  2005   – Mokarrameh Ghanbari, Iranian painter (b. 1928)
  2005   – Immanuel C. Y. Hsu, Chinese sinologist and scholar (b. 1923)
  2005   – Rosa Parks, American civil rights activist (b. 1913)
  2005   – Robert Sloman, English actor and screenwriter (b. 1926)
2006 – Enolia McMillan, American educator and activist (b. 1904)
  2006   – William Montgomery Watt, Scottish historian and scholar (b. 1909)
2007 – Petr Eben, Czech organist and composer (b. 1929)
  2007   – Ian Middleton, New Zealand author (b. 1928)
  2007   – Alisher Saipov, Kyrgyzstan journalist (b. 1981)
  2007   – Anne Weale, English journalist and author (b. 1929)
2008 – Moshe Cotel, American pianist and composer (b. 1943)
2010 – Mike Esposito, American author and illustrator (b. 1927)
  2010   – Lamont Johnson, American actor, director, and producer (b. 1922)
  2010   – Joseph Stein, American author and playwright (b. 1912)
2011 – Sansan Chien, Taiwanese composer and educator (b. 1967)
  2011   – John McCarthy, American computer scientist and academic, developed the Lisp programming language (b. 1927)
2012 – Peggy Ahern, American actress (b. 1917)
  2012   – Anita Björk, Swedish actress (b. 1923)
  2012   – Jeff Blatnick, American wrestler and sportscaster (b. 1957)
  2012   – Bill Dees, American singer-songwriter and guitarist (b. 1939)
  2012   – Margaret Osborne duPont, American tennis player (b. 1918)
2013 – Antonia Bird, English director and producer (b. 1951)
  2013   – Brooke Greenberg, American girl with a rare genetic disorder (b. 1993)
  2013   – Ana Bertha Lepe, Mexican model and actress (b. 1934)
  2013   – Lew Mayne, American football player and coach (b. 1920)
2014 – Mbulaeni Mulaudzi, South African runner (b. 1980)
  2014   – S. S. Rajendran, Indian actor, director, and producer (b. 1928)
  2014   – Marcia Strassman, American actress and singer (b. 1948)
2015 – Michael Beetham, English commander and pilot (b. 1923)
  2015   – Alvin Bronstein, American lawyer and academic (b. 1928)
  2015   – Margarita Khemlin, Ukrainian-Russian author and critic (b. 1960)
  2015   – Ján Chryzostom Korec, Slovak cardinal (b. 1924)
  2015   – Maureen O'Hara, Irish-American actress and singer (b. 1920)
2016 – Bobby Vee, American pop singer (b. 1943)
  2016   – Jorge Batlle Ibáñez, Uruguayan politician, former president (2000-2005) (b. 1927)
2017 – Fats Domino, American pianist and singer-songwriter (b. 1928)
  2017   – Robert Guillaume, American actor (b. 1927)
  2017   – Girija Devi, Indian classical singer (b. 1929)
2018 – Tony Joe White, American singer/songwriter (b. 1943)
2021 – James Michael Tyler, American actor (b. 1962)
2022 – Leslie Jordan, American actor, writer, and singer (b. 1955)

Holidays and observances
Christian feast day:
Anthony Mary Claret
Eberigisil (Evergitus)
Five Martyrs of Carthage (Felix and Companions)
Luigi Guanella
Magloire of Dol
Martin of Vertou
Proclus of Constantinople
Rafael Guízar y Valencia
Senoch
October 24 (Eastern Orthodox liturgics)
Day of Special Forces of the Armed Forces (Russia)
Food Day (United States)
Independence Day, celebrates the independence of Zambia from United Kingdom in 1964.
International Day of Diplomats
Suez Day (Egypt)
United Nations Day, the anniversary of the 1945 Charter of the United Nations (International)
World Development Information Day
World Polio Day

References

External links

 
 
 

Days of the year
October